Balbir Singh Rajhans, or better known as B. S. Rajhans, is a director of Malay films. His first film was Laila Majnun which was released in 1933.

Early life

B. S. Rajhans was born in Calcutta, India but he was based in Singapore for many years. He was an ethnic Punjabi.

Filmography

 Aloha
 Anjuran Nasib
 Antara Senyum Dan Tangis
 Bapa Saya
 Berdosa
 Chinta
 Sejoli
 Dewi Murni
 Chempaka
 Laila Majnun
 Mard e punjab
 Nasib
 Nilam (1949)
 Pisau Berachun
 Rachun Dunia
 Singapura Di Waktu Malam
 Seruan Merdeka
 Yatim Piatu

External links
 https://web.archive.org/web/20110722232811/http://www.sinemamalaysia.com.my/main/index.php?mod=crew&p=info&id=5606
 
 http://www.p-ramlee.com/p-ramlee/gallery/rajhans.htm

Film directors from Kolkata
Malaysian Sikhs
Punjabi people
Malaysian people of Indian descent
Malaysian people of Punjabi descent
Malay-language film directors
1903 births
1955 deaths